This is a list of the main career statistics of professional Belarusian tennis player Aryna Sabalenka. She has won twelve singles titles and five doubles titles on the WTA Tour. Her most significant titles are the 2023 Australian Open in singles, and the 2019 US Open and 2021 Australian Open in doubles, won alongside Elise Mertens. She also has two Premier Mandatory titles, both in doubles, at the Indian Wells Open and Miami Open in 2019. 
In singles, she has four WTA 1000/Premier 5 titles, at the Wuhan Open in 2018 and 2019, at the Qatar Open in 2020, and at the Madrid Open in 2021. Some of her other results include, semifinal of the 2018 Cincinnati Open in singles and final of the 2019 Wuhan Open in doubles. In 2019, she won the WTA Elite Trophy in singles, defeating Kiki Bertens in the final. Playing for the Belarus in Fed Cup, Sabalenka reached the final in 2017, but the team lost to United States. Two-years later, Belarus reached the semifinals, also with Sabalenka in their team. She achieved top 5 in both singles and doubles, having a career-high singles ranking of world No. 2, while in doubles she is the world No. 1, both achieved in 2021.

Performance timelines

Only main-draw results in WTA Tour, Grand Slam tournaments, Fed Cup/Billie Jean King Cup and Olympic Games are included in win–loss records.

Singles
Current through the 2023 Indian Wells Open.

Doubles
Current after the 2023 Adelaide International 1.

Significant finals

Grand Slam finals

Singles: 1 (1 title)

Doubles: 2 (2 titles)

WTA Championships finals

Singles: 1 (runner-up)

WTA 1000 finals

Singles: 5 (4 titles, 1 runner-up)

Doubles: 3 (2 titles, 1 runner-up)

WTA Elite Trophy

Singles: 1 (title)

WTA career finals

Singles: 21 (12 titles, 9 runner–ups)

Doubles: 8 (6 titles, 2 runner–ups)

WTA 125 tournament finals

Singles: 1 (1 title)

Doubles: 1 (1 title)

ITF Circuit finals
Sabalenka debuted at the ITF Women's World Tennis Tour in 2012 at the $25K event in her hometown Minsk. In singles, she has been in eight finals and won five of them, while in doubles, she has been in two finals and won one of them. Her biggest titles on the ITF Circuit were two $50K events in Tianjin and Toyota, both achieved in 2016 in singles.

Singles: 8 (5 titles, 3 runner-ups)

Doubles: 2 (1 title, 1 runner-up)

Fed Cup/Billie Jean King Cup participation

Singles: 16 (10–6)

Doubles: 5 (1–4)

WTA Tour career earnings 
Current after the 2022 season.

Career Grand Slam statistics

Grand Slam tournament seedings 
The tournaments won by Sabalenka are in boldface, and advanced into finals by Sabalenka are in italics.

Singles

Doubles

Best Grand Slam results details 
Grand Slam winners are in boldface, and runner–ups are in italics.

Singles

Record against other players

No. 1 wins

Record against top 10 players 

 She has a  record against players who were, at the time the match was played, ranked in the top 10.

Longest winning streaks

15-match win streak (2020–21)

Notes

References

External links
 
 

Tennis career statistics